Chaoboridae, commonly known as phantom midges or glassworms, is a family of fairly common midges with a cosmopolitan distribution. They are closely related to the Corethrellidae and Chironomidae; the adults are differentiated through peculiarities in wing venation.

If they eat at all, the adults feed on nectar. The larvae are aquatic and unique in their feeding method: the antennae of phantom midge larvae are modified into grasping organs slightly resembling the raptorial arms of a mantis, with which they capture prey. They feed largely on small insects such as mosquito larvae and crustaceans such as Daphnia. The antennae impale or crush the prey, and then bring it to the larval mouth, or stylet.

The larvae swim and sometimes form large swarms in their lacustrine habitats.

Description
The larvae are nearly transparent, sometimes with a slightly yellow cast; their most opaque features are two air bags, one in the thorax, one in the abdomen about in the second last segment. The adults are delicate flies that closely resemble Chironomidae. Their antennae are 15-segmented and the females' antennae are somewhat bristly; the males' antennae in contrast, are very plumose. In this respect too they resemble many of the Nematocera, and in particular the Chironomidae. The species vary in size from about 2 mm to 10 mm long in their adult stages.

Genera
These 26 genera belong to the family Chaoboridae:

 Astrocorethra Kalugina, 1986 g
 Australomochlonyx c g
 Baisomyia Kalugina, 1991 g
 Baleiomyia c g
 Chachotosha Lukashevich, 1996 g
 Chaoborites Kalugina, 1985 g
 Chaoborus Lichtenstein, 1800 i c g b
 Chaoburmus c g
 Chironomaptera Ping, 1929 g
 Cryophila Edwards, 1930 i c g
 Dixamima Rohdendorf, 1951 g
 Eucorethra Coquillet, 1903 i c g b
 Eucorethrina c g
 Gedanoborus Szadziewski & Gilka, 2007 g
 Gydarina Kalugina, 1991 g
 Helokrenia Kalugina, 1985 g
 Hypsocorethra Kalugina, 1985 g
 Iyaiyai Evenhuis, 1994 g
 Libanoborus Azar, Waller & Nel, 2009 g
 Mesocorethra c g
 Mochlonyx Loew, 1844 i c g b
 Palaeomochlonyx Wichard, Gröhn & Seredszus, 2009 g
 Praechaoborus Kalugina, 1985 g
 Promochlonyx c g
 Sayomyia Coquillett, 1903 g
 Taimyborus Lukashevich, 1999 g

Data sources: i = ITIS, c = Catalogue of Life, g = GBIF, b = Bugguide.net

References

External links
Image Gallery from Diptera.info

 
Nematocera families